"He Was On to Somethin' (So He Made You)" is a song written by Sonny Curtis, and recorded by American country music artist Ricky Skaggs.  It was released in September 1990 as the fifth single from the album Kentucky Thunder.  The song reached #25 on the Billboard Hot Country Singles & Tracks chart.

Chart performance

Year-end charts

References

1990 singles
Ricky Skaggs songs
Songs written by Sonny Curtis
Song recordings produced by Steve Buckingham (record producer)
Song recordings produced by Ricky Skaggs
Epic Records singles
1989 songs